This is a list of imaginary characters in fiction, being characters that are imagined by one of the other characters:

References

Imagination
imaginary